Léo Eichmann (born 24 December 1936) is a Swiss football goalkeeper who played for Switzerland in the 1966 FIFA World Cup. He also played for FC La Chaux-de-Fonds.

References

External links
FIFA profile

1936 births
Swiss men's footballers
Switzerland international footballers
Association football goalkeepers
FC La Chaux-de-Fonds players
1966 FIFA World Cup players
Living people